Sudeepa is an Indian actor and director who primarily works as leading actor role in the Kannada film industry. He has also worked in Hindi, Telugu and Tamil films. He is also popularly known as Kicha Sudeepa.

Film

As actor

As director, writer and producer

Cameo appearances
All films are in Kannada, unless otherwise noted.

As narrator
All films are in Kannada, unless otherwise noted.

Television

See also
 List of awards and nominations received by Sudeepa

References

External links
 

Indian filmographies
Male actor filmographies
Director filmographies